Simone Cipriani (born 1964) is an officer of the United Nations. He created and he manages the Ethical Fashion Initiative of the International Trade Centre (ITC), which is a joint agency of the United Nations and the WTO. He is the Chair of the Steering Committee of the UN Alliance for Sustainable Fashion.

Career overview
Simone Cipriani was born in Pistoia, Tuscany, Italy, and completed his studies in Political Sciences and International Economy at the University of Florence.

The Ethical Fashion Initiative
The idea for The Ethical Fashion Initiative was born when Cipriani was introduced to skilled artisans living in the slums of Nairobi, Kenya. After a successful one-year trial, the Ethical Fashion Initiative became an ongoing United Nations project. The Ethical Fashion Initiative represents a new way of doing business in the fashion sector, making it possible for communities in slums and impoverished rural areas to be part of the international value chain of fashion. It empowers women by generating work, allowing them to become micro-entrepreneurs. This is achieved through a business support infrastructure that facilitates fair collaboration with fashion houses and large distributors. The Ethical Fashion Initiative also supports and promotes emerging design talent from Africa.

Underpinning its success is an economic system designed to work in areas of deprivation. Because of this system of logistics The Ethical Fashion Initiative is able to work over a vast geographical area, both in slums and disadvantaged rural areas. Cipriani is responsible for this system which has been praised by The Economist.

Personal life
Cipriani has three daughters with his wife Stefania Gori. He is connected by marriage to the Collezione Gori of Tuscany, which houses site-specific artworks, including sculptures by Daniel Buren and Sol LeWitt.

References

External links
Official website

Italian officials of the United Nations